Deer Island is an island in the Alexander Archipelago of Southeast Alaska, United States. The first European to sight the island was James Johnstone, one of George Vancouver’s officers during his 1791-95 expedition, in 1793. It was named in 1886 by Lieutenant Commander A. S. Snow, USN.

References

Islands of the Alexander Archipelago
Islands of Wrangell, Alaska
Islands of Alaska